Daniil Pavlovich Utkin (born 12 October 1999) is a Russian football player. He plays as a central midfielder for FC Rostov and the Russia national team.

Club career
He made his Russian Professional Football League debut for FC Krasnodar-2 on 10 March 2018 in a game against FC Chayka Peschanokopskoye.

He made his first appearance for the main squad of FC Krasnodar on 1 November 2018 in a Russian Cup game against FC Krylia Sovetov Samara.

He made his Russian Premier League debut for Krasnodar on 9 December 2018 in a game against FC Ufa as a 82nd-minute substitute for Viktor Claesson.

On 11 June 2021, he joined FC Akhmat Grozny on loan until 31 May 2022.

On 16 June 2022, Utkin signed a four-year contract with FC Rostov.

International career
Utkin was called up to the Russia national football team for the first time for a friendly against Kyrgyzstan in September 2022. He made his debut on 24 September 2022 in that game and scored the winning goal in the 89th minute.

Career statistics

Club

International

International goals
Scores and results list Russia's goal tally first, score column indicates score after each Utkin goal.

References

External links
 
 

1999 births
People from Aksaysky District
Sportspeople from Rostov Oblast
Living people
Russian footballers
Russia youth international footballers
Russia under-21 international footballers
Russia international footballers
Association football midfielders
FC Krasnodar-2 players
FC Krasnodar players
FC Akhmat Grozny players
FC Rostov players
Russian Premier League players
Russian First League players
Russian Second League players